Yvan Desjardins (born October 6, 1975) is a Canadian figure skating coach and former competitor. He reached the free skate at two ISU Championships.

Career 
Desjardins competed at the 1993 and 1994 World Junior Championships, qualifying to the free skate at both events. His best final result, 11th, came in 1993 in Seoul, South Korea.

After retiring from competition, Desjardins became a coach, based in Rosemère, Quebec. In August 2015, he became only the 13th person to achieve Level 5 in Skate Canada's National Coaching Certification Program. In 2016, he received the Skate Canada Competitive Coach Award of Excellence. His past and present students include, Nicolas Nadeau, Jessica Dubé, Shawn Sawyer and Joseph Phan.

Personal life 
Desjardins was born on October 6, 1975, in Boisbriand, Quebec. He studied at the Université de Montréal. He is married to figure skating coach Claudine Morency and has two children.

Competitive highlights

References 

1975 births
Canadian figure skating coaches
Canadian male single skaters
Living people
People from Boisbriand
Sportspeople from Quebec